Denive Balmforth (born 1 October 2003) is an English professional rugby league footballer who plays as a  for Newcastle Thunder in the RFL Championship, on short-term loan from Hull F.C. in the Betfred Super League.

In 2022 he made his Hull début in the Super League against Toulouse Olympique.

References

External links
Hull FC profile

2003 births
Living people
English rugby league players
Hull F.C. players
Newcastle Thunder players
Rugby league players from Leeds